Metaphysics (Greek: τὰ μετὰ τὰ φυσικά, "those after the physics"; Latin: Metaphysica) is one of the principal works of Aristotle, in which he develops the doctrine that he calls First Philosophy. The work is a compilation of various texts treating abstract subjects, notably substance theory, different kinds of causation, form and matter, the existence of mathematical objects and the cosmos, which together constitute much of the branch of philosophy later known as metaphysics.

Date, style and composition
Many of Aristotle's works are extremely compressed and thus baffling to beginners, and many scholars believe that in their current form, they are little more than lecture notes. Subsequent to the arrangement of Aristotle's works by Andronicus of Rhodes in the first century BC, a number of his treatises were referred to as the writings "after ("meta") the Physics.", the origin of the current title for the collection Metaphysics.  Some have interpreted the expression "meta" to imply that the subject of the work goes "beyond" that of Aristotle's Physics or that it is metatheoretical in relation to the Physics.  But others believe that "meta" referred simply to the work's place in the canonical arrangement of Aristotle's writings, which is at least as old as Andronicus of Rhodes or even Hermippus of Smyrna.  In other surviving works of Aristotle, the metaphysical treatises are referred to as  "the [writings] concerning first philosophy"; which was the term Aristotle used for metaphysics.

It is notoriously difficult to specify the date at which Aristotle wrote these treatises as a whole or even individually, especially because the Metaphysics is, in Jonathan Barnes' words, "a farrago, a hotch-potch", and more generally because of the difficulty of dating any of Aristotle's writings. The order in which the books were written is not known; their arrangement is due to later editors. In the manuscripts, books are referred to by Greek letters. For many scholars, it is customary to refer to the books by their letter names. Book 1 is called Alpha (Α); 2, little alpha (α); 3, Beta (Β); 4, Gamma (Γ); 5, Delta (Δ); 6, Epsilon (Ε); 7, Zeta (Ζ); 8, Eta (Η); 9, Theta (Θ); 10, Iota (Ι); 11, Kappa (Κ); 12, Lambda (Λ); 13, Mu (Μ); 14, Nu (Ν).

Outline

Books I–VI: Alpha, little Alpha, Beta, Gamma, Delta and Epsilon 
Book I or Alpha begins by discussing the nature of knowledge and compares knowledge gained from the senses and from memory, arguing that knowledge is acquired from memory through experience. It then defines "wisdom"(sophia) as a knowledge of the first principles(arche) or causes of things. Because those who are wise understand the first principles and causes, they know the why of things, unlike those who only know that things are a certain way based on their memory and sensations. The wise are able to teach because they know the why of things, and so they are better fitted to command, rather than to obey. He then surveys the first principles and causes of previous philosophers, starting with the material monists of the Ionian school and continuing up until Plato.
Book II or "little alpha": Book II addresses a possible objection to the account of how we understand first principles and thus acquire wisdom, that attempting to discover the first principle would lead to an infinite series of causes.  It argues in response that idea of an infinite causal series is absurd, and argues that only things that are created or destroyed require a cause, and that thus there must be a primary cause that is eternal, an idea he develops later in Book Lambda.
Book III or Beta lists the main problems or puzzles (aporia) of philosophy.
Book IV or Gamma: Chapters 2 and 3 argue for its status as a subject in its own right. The rest is a defense of (a) what we now call the principle of contradiction, the principle that it is not possible for the same proposition to be (the case) and not to be (the case), and (b) what we now call the principle of excluded middle: tertium non datur — there cannot be an intermediary between contradictory statements.
Book V or Delta ("philosophical lexicon") is a list of definitions of about thirty key terms such as cause, nature, one, and many.
Book VI or Epsilon has two main concerns. The first concern is the hierarchy of the sciences: productive, practical or theoretical. Aristotle considers theoretical sciences superior because they study beings for their own sake—for example, Physics studies beings that can be moved—and do not have a target (Telos (τέλος), end or goal; τέλειος, complete or perfect) beyond themselves. He argues that the study of being qua being, or First Philosophy, is superior to all the other theoretical sciences because it is concerned the ultimate causes of all reality, not just the secondary causes of a part of reality. The second concern of Epsilon is the study of "accidents", those attributes that do not depend on (τέχνη) or exist by necessity, which Aristotle believes do not deserve to be studied as a science.

Books VII–IX: Zeta, Eta, and Theta 
Books Zeta, Eta, and Theta are generally considered the core of the Metaphysics. 
Book Zeta (VII) begins by stating that "being" has several senses, the purpose of philosophy is to understand the primary kind of being, called substance (ousia) and determine what substances there are, a concept that Aristotle develops in the Categories.
Zeta goes on to consider four candidates for substance: (i) the ‘essence’ or ‘what it is to be’ of a thing (ii) the universal, (iii) the genus to which a substance belongs and (iv) the material substrate or which underlies all the properties of a thing.  
 He dismisses the idea that matter can be substance, for if we eliminate everything that is a property from what can have the property, such as matter and the shape, we are left with something that has no properties at all. Such 'ultimate matter' cannot be substance.  Separability and 'this-ness' are fundamental to our concept of substance.
 Aristotle then describes own theory, that essence is the criterion of substantiality.  The essence of something is what is included in a secundum se ('according to itself') account of a thing, i.e. which tells what a thing is by its very nature.  You are not musical by your very nature. But you are a human by your very nature.  Your essence is what is mentioned in the definition of you. 
 Aristotle then considers, and dismisses, the idea that substance is the universal or the genus, criticizing the Platonic theory of Ideas.
 Aristotle argues that if genus and species are individual things, then different species of the same genus contain the genus as individual thing, which leads to absurdities.  Moreover, individuals are incapable of definition. 
Finally, he concludes book Zeta by arguing that substance is really a cause.

Book Eta consists of a summary of what has been said so far (i.e., in Book Zeta) about substance, and adds a few further details regarding difference and unity.

Book Theta sets out to define potentiality and actuality. Chapters 1–5 discuss potentiality, the potential of something to change: potentiality is "a principle of change in another thing or in the thing itself qua other." In chapter 6 Aristotle turns to actuality. We can only know actuality through observation or "analogy;" thus "as that which builds is to that which is capable of building, so is that which is awake to that which is asleep...or that which is separated from matter to matter itself". Actuality is the completed state of something that had the potential to be completed. The relationship between actuality and potentiality can be thought of as the relationship between form and matter, but with the added aspect of time. Actuality and potentiality are distinctions that occur over time (diachronic), whereas form and matter are distinctions that can be made at fixed points in time (synchronic).

Books X–XIV: Iota, Kappa, Lambda, Mu, and Nu 
Book X or Iota: Discussion of unity, one and many, sameness and difference.
Book XI or Kappa: Briefer versions of other chapters and of parts of the Physics.
Book XII or Lambda: Further remarks on beings in general, first principles, and God or gods. This book includes Aristotle's famous description of the unmoved mover, "the most divine of things observed by us", as "the thinking of thinking".
Books XIII and XIV, or Mu and Nu: Philosophy of mathematics, in particular how numbers exist.

Legacy 
The Metaphysics is considered to be one of the greatest philosophical works. Its influence on the Greeks, the Muslim philosophers, Maimonides thence the scholastic philosophers and even writers such as Dante was immense. 

In the 3rd century, Alexander of Aphrodisias wrote a commentary on the first five books of the Metaphysics, and a commentary transmitted under his name exists for the final nine, but modern scholars doubt that this part was written by him. Themistius wrote an epitome of the work, of which book 12 survivies in a Hebrew translation. The Neoplatonists Syrianus and Asclepius of Tralles also wrote commentaries on the work, where they attempted to synthesize Aristotle's doctrines with Neoplatonic  cosmology. 

Aristotle's works gained a reputation for complextiy that is most evident than in the Metaphysics — Avicenna said that he had read the Metaphysics of Aristotle forty times, but did not understand it until he also read al-Farabi's Purposes of the Metaphysics of Aristotle.

The flourishing of Arabic Aristotelian scholarship reached its peak with the work of Ibn Rushd (Latinized: Averroes), whose extensive writings on Aristotle's work led to his later designation as "The Commentator" by future generations of scholars.  Maimonides wrote the Guide to the Perplexed in the 12th century, to demonstrate the compatibility of Aristotelian science with Biblical revelation.

The Fourth Crusade (1202-1204) facilitated the discovery and delivery of many original Greek manuscripts to Western Europe. William of Moerbeke's translations of the work formed the basis of the commentaries on the Metaphysics by Albert the Great, Thomas Aquinas and Duns Scotus. They were also used by modern scholars for Greek editions, as William had access to Greek manuscripts that are now lost.  Werner Jaeger lists William's translation in his edition of the Greek text in the Scriptorum Classicorum Bibliotheca Oxoniensis (Oxford 1962).

Textual Criticism 
In the 19th century, with the rise of textual criticism, the Metaphysics was examined anew. Critics, noting the wide variety of topics and the seemingly illogical order of the books, concluded that it was actually a collection of shorter works thrown together haphazardly. In the 20th century two general editions have been produced by W. D. Ross (1924) and by W. Jaeger (1957). Based on a careful study of the content and of the cross-references within them, W. D. Ross concluded that books A, B, Γ, E, Z, H, Θ, M, N, and I "form a more or less continuous work", while the remaining books α, Δ, Κ and Λ were inserted into their present locations by later editors.  However, Ross cautions that books A, B, Γ, E, Z, H, Θ, M, N, and I — with or without the insertion of the others — do not constitute "a complete work". Werner Jaeger further maintained that the different books were taken from different periods of Aristotle's life. Everyman's Library, for their 1000th volume, published the Metaphysics in a rearranged order that was intended to make the work easier for readers.

Editing the Metaphysics has become an open issue in works and studies of the new millennium. New critical editions have been produced of books Gamma, Alpha, and Lambda.  Differences from the more-familiar 20th Century critical editions of Ross and Jaeger mainly depend on the stemma codicum of Aristotle's Metaphysics, of which different versions have been proposed since 1970.

Notes

Editions and Translations 
 Greek text with commentary: Aristotle's Metaphysics.  W. D. Ross.  2 vols.  Oxford: Clarendon Press, 1924.  Reprinted 1953 with corrections.
 Greek text: Aristotelis Metaphysica. Ed. Werner Jaeger. Oxford Classical Texts. Oxford University Press, 1957. .
 Greek text with English: Metaphysics. Trans. Hugh Tredennick. 2 vols. Loeb Classical Library 271, 287. Harvard U. Press, 1933–35. , .
 Aristotle's Metaphysics. Trans. Hippocrates Gorgias Apostle. Bloomington: Indiana U. Press, 1966.
 .

Ancient and Medieval Commentaries 
  (rpt. Notre Dame, Ind.: Dumb Ox, 1995).

References 
 Wolfgang Class: Aristotle's Metaphysics, A Philological Commentary:
 Volume I: Textual Criticism, Saldenburg 2014;
 Volume II: The Composition of the Metaphysics, Saldenburg 2015;
 Volume III: Sources and Parallels, Saldenburg 2017;
 Volume IV: Reception and Criticism, Saldenburg 2018.
 Copleston, Frederick, S.J.  A History of Philosophy: Volume I Greece and Rome (Parts I and II) New York: Image Books, 1962.

Further reading 
 Ackrill, J. L., 1963, Aristotle: Categories and De Interpretatione, Oxford: Clarendon Press.
 Alexandrou, S., 2014, Aristotle’s Metaphysics Lambda: Annotated Critical Edition, Leiden: Brill.
 Anagnostopoulos, Georgios (ed.), 2009, A Companion to Aristotle, Chichester: Wiley-Blackwell.
 Elders, L., 1972, Aristotle’s Theology: A Commentary on Book Λ of the Metaphysics, Assen: Van Gorcum.
 Gerson, Lloyd P. (ed.) and Joseph Owens, 2007, Aristotle’s Gradations of being in Metaphysics E-Z, South Bend: St Augustine’s Press.
 Gill, Mary Louise, 1989, Aristotle on Substance: The Paradox of Unity, Princeton: Princeton University Press.

External links

 Available bundled with Organon and other works – can be downloaded as .epub, .mobi and other formats.
 English translation and original Greek at Perseus. Translation by Hugh Tredennick from the Loeb Classical Library.
 English translation by W. D. Ross at MIT's Internet Classics Archive.
 Averroes' commentary on the Metaphysics, in Latin, together with the 'old' (Arabic) and new translation based on William of Moerbeke at Gallica.
 Aristotle: Metaphysics entry by Joe Sachs in the Internet Encyclopedia of Philosophy
 
 A good summary of scholarly comments at: Theory and History of Ontology
 

Metaphysics literature
Works by Aristotle